Holly Ridge is a town in Onslow County, North Carolina, United States. The 2010 population was 1,268. It is part of the Jacksonville, North Carolina Metropolitan Statistical Area. It is considered the gateway to Topsail Island.

Population Boom: In 1940, the town had 28 residents. Just three years later in 1943, the town had ballooned to 110,000 residents due to the establishing of the Camp Davis Army post.

Industry: The town's largest employer is J&J Snack Foods. Industrial growth is strengthening with the growth of the Camp Davis Industrial Park which resides on the same land that Camp Davis had occupied. The industrial park's largest tenants are Gulfstream Steel and Onslow Bay Boatworks. Atlantic Seafood is planning a 63,000 square foot facility with construction slated to begin in 2021. Plans for developing an additional 60 acres (referred to Camp Davis Industrial Park Phase 2) is underway with hopes to have shovel ready lots available for purchase in 2023.

Geography
Holly Ridge is located at  (34.491867, -77.553091).

Demographics

2020 census

As of the 2020 United States census, there were 4,171 people, 981 households, and 702 families residing in the town.

2000 census
As of the census of 2000, there were 831 people, 321 households, and 226 families residing in the town. The population density was 604.9 people per square mile (234.2/km2). There were 498 housing units at an average density of 362.5 per square mile (140.3/km2). The racial makeup of the town was 79.78% White, 14.56% African American, 1.32% Native American, 0.60% Asian, 0.12% Pacific Islander, 2.53% from other races, and 1.08% from two or more races. Hispanic or Latino of any race were 3.85% of the population.

There were 321 households, out of which 37.4% had children under the age of 18 living with them, 42.4% were married couples living together, 22.7% had a female householder with no husband present, and 29.3% were non-families. 19.6% of all households were made up of individuals, and 9.0% had someone living alone who was 65 years of age or older. The average household size was 2.49 and the average family size was 2.87.

In the town, the population was spread out, with 27.6% under the age of 18, 10.1% from 18 to 24, 27.4% from 25 to 44, 20.6% from 45 to 64, and 14.3% who were 65 years of age or older. The median age was 33 years. For every 100 females, there were 86.3 males. For every 100 females age 18 and over, there were 78.1 males.

The median income for a household in the town was $25,573, and the median income for a family was $26,979. Males had a median income of $27,059 versus $21,000 for females. The per capita income for the town was $12,585. About 19.0% of families and 24.1% of the population were below the poverty line, including 35.1% of those under age 18 and 14.3% of those age 65 or over.

Education
 Dixon Elementary School
 Dixon Middle School
 Dixon High School
Coastal Elementary School

References

External links
Town of Holly Ridge Facebook Page

Towns in Onslow County, North Carolina
Towns in North Carolina